Bateson is an English language patronymic surname meaning "son of Batte", a medieval diminutive of Bartholomew.  It is rare as a given name.  People with the surname Bateson include:

 Edith Bateson (1867–1938), English artist
 Frank Bateson (1909–2007), New Zealand astronomer
 Frederick Wilse Bateson (1901–1978), English literary scholar
 Gregory Bateson (1904–1980), British anthropologist (son of William Bateson)
 Jack Bateson (born 1994), British boxer
 Mary Catherine Bateson (1939-2021), U.S. writer and anthropologist (daughter of Gregory Bateson)
 Patrick Bateson (1938–2017), British biologist and science writer
 Paul Bateson (born 1940), American radiological technician who appeared in The Exorcist and was later convicted of a murder
 Thomas Bateson (c.1570–1630), English madrigal composer
 Thomas Bateson, 1st Baron Deramore (1819-1890), British Conservative politician
 Timothy Bateson (1926–2009), British actor
 William Bateson (1861–1926), British geneticist who coined the term "genetics"
 William Henry Bateson (1812–1881), British academic

See also
 Bates (disambiguation)
 Beatson (disambiguation)

English-language surnames
Patronymic surnames
Surnames from given names